Elizabeth Oval, (currently X Convenience Oval due to sponsorship reasons), is an Australian rules football stadium located in Elizabeth, a suburb 24km North of Adelaide, South Australia.

Elizabeth Oval is the home ground of the Central District Football Club who play in the South Australian National Football League (SANFL). The Bulldogs (also commonly known as the Centrals) played their first SANFL league match at the ground in 1964 after playing in the SANFL B-grade (Reserves) since the club's inception in 1959.

The ground has a capacity of approximately 18,000 people, with a single grandstand that seats 1,500. The oval, the longest goal to goal venue in the SANFL at 178m (3m longer than Woodville Oval, though fence to fence it is 15m shorter), and is surrounded by concrete terracing on the grandstand side of the ground, plus a 5 row ring of concrete around the rest of the ground, with grass banks around the entire outer. The ground record crowd of 16,029 was set in 1984 for an SANFL match between the Centrals and the Port Adelaide Magpies. 

After negotiations between Central District and the City of Playford, light towers were installed in March 2006 allowing the Bulldogs to play night SANFL games. The first official night game was held at the oval in April 2006 when 7,329 fans turned out to see the defending SANFL premiers (Centrals) defeat Sturt. The ground has not been used for many night matches since the 2000's, other than a few pre season matches. 

The ground was known as Elizabeth Oval from the time it opened until 2001. In 2002 the Club signed a naming rights deal with NAP Finance and the oval's name changed to NAP Oval. Elizabeth Oval was the first SANFL Club Venue to secure an Oval Naming Rights Deal. The first deal expired after 2005 and NAP was replaced by Northern Adelaide home builder Hamra Homes who held the naming rights until the end of 2010. From 2011 to 2015 the oval was known as Playford Alive Oval, and in 2016 changed its name to My Money House Oval. From 2019 South Australian service station company X Convenience held the naming rights of the Oval.

Elizabeth Oval is easily accessible by either car or public transport with Adelaide's northern suburban commuter railway line, the Gawler railway line passing by the western side of the oval and the main bus and train interchange (Elizabeth railway station) located within five minutes walking distance of the oval. The ground also has plenty of in ground (for members, players and officials) and on-street car parking, as well as ample parking at the nearby shopping mall, the Elizabeth City Centre.

References and notes

External links

Australian rules football grounds
Sports venues in Adelaide